Gregory Henriquez  (born 1963) is a Canadian architect who has designed community-based mixed-use projects in Vancouver, Toronto and Seattle. He is the managing principal of Vancouver-based Henriquez Partners Architects, founded in 1969 by his father, Richard Henriquez.

Background
Henriquez was born in 1963, in Winnipeg, Manitoba, to artist Carol Aaron and architect Richard Henriquez. He received a bachelor's degree in architecture from Carleton University and studied in the history and theory master's program at McGill University, in both programs under Alberto Perez-Gomez. He joined his father's studio after completing his architectural education in 1989, and became its managing partner in 2005.

Among other projects, Henriquez was involved in the redevelopment of the Woodward's Building, which at $475 million, was at the time (2004-2010), one of the biggest single site developments in Vancouver history. He negotiated with the City of Vancouver on behalf of the developer and consulted with community groups to maintain the project's financial feasibility and meet the neighbourhood's social requirements. 

In his books Towards an Ethical Architecture (2006), Body Heat (2010), Citizen City (2016) and Ghetto: Sanctuary for Sale (2021), Henriquez discusses the role of the architect in society, and the place of ethics, activism and social justice within contemporary practice.

References

Living people
1963 births
Carleton University alumni
Canadian architects
Jewish architects
McGill School of Architecture alumni
Members of the Royal Canadian Academy of Arts
People from Winnipeg